Jason Lai may refer to:

Jason Lai (conductor), a British orchestral conductor
Jason Lai (policeman), officer in San Francisco Police Department

See also
Jason
Lai (surname)